Kiss My Ass: The Video, also known as Kiss My Ass: Classic Kiss Regrooved, is a long-form music video program released in 1994 on VHS and laserdisc by American hard rock band Kiss. The video includes clips from various live concerts and interviews with Paul Stanley and Gene Simmons. The DVD version was released in 2004.

Reception
Kiss My Ass: The Video was certified Gold in the US.

Track listing

Certifications

References

External links
 Kiss Online

Kiss (band) video albums
Live video albums
1994 video albums
1994 live albums